The 1930 presidential elections in Latvia took place in April 8 and 9, 1930, during the term of the 3rd Saeima. Incumbent president Gustavs Zemgals refused to run again, so, like in the 1927 elections, many rounds of voting were required until the Latvian Farmers' Union candidate Alberts Kviesis was elected president and became the 3rd President of Latvia.

Candidates

Election process and results
The presidential election began on April 8, 1930. In the first round of elections, the Chairman of the Chamber of Courts Alberts Kviesis, the long-term Speaker of the Saeima from the LSDSP Pauls Kalniņš and the Communist candidate Ernests Miezis participated. In the first vote, Kviesis received 47 votes, Kalniņš received 36 votes, and Miezis received 6. In the second vote, Kviesis received 47 votes, Kalniņš received 32, and Miezis received 5. In the third vote, the candidates were Kviesis and Kalniņš. Kviesis received 46 votes while Kalniņš received 33. In the fourth round there was only one candidat, Kviesis, who received 49 votes. Consequently, the elections were planned to continue at the next sitting of the Saeima.

Elections continued on April 9. Kviesis and Kalniņš were nominated as candidates for the second round. In the first ballot, Kviesis received 47 votes, Kalniņš received 35. In the second ballot, Kviesis again received 47 votes, Kalniņš while received 36. Only Kviesis took part in the third ballot, who received 55 votes and was elected President.

References

Presidential elections in Latvia
Latvia
1930 in Latvia